Cylindrepomus vittatus is a species of beetle in the family Cerambycidae. It was described by Pic in 1925, originally under the genus Hippardium.

References

Dorcaschematini
Beetles described in 1925